Krsna Solo (born Amitav Sarkar) is a music composer, singer-songwriter and a music producer from India, who debuted with the popular Hindi film "Tanu Weds Manu" in 2011. Among his awards are a Filmfare R.D. Burman Award, Stardust Award for Best New Music Director. His work also includes Jolly LLB, Tanu Weds Manu Returns, Tamanchey, Oonga and more. One of his mentionable international score is for the documentary called India's Daughter by Leslee Udwin.

Early life
Krsna Solo was born in a Bengali family in Siliguri, West Bengal. After finishing school from Kolkata he graduated from National Institute of Design, Ahmedabad in Films Communication. Thereafter he came to Mumbai to pursue his childhood dream to become a musician and started his career as a film director in advertising. After a few years he became an active musician and debuted in Bollywood.

Career
He made his debut in Bollywood with Hindi movie Tanu Weds Manu, a 2011 Hindi romantic Comedy film directed by Anand L. Rai, and produced by Shailesh R Singh and stars Kangana Ranaut and R. Madhavan. His work for National Award-winning film "Tanu Weds Manu " and the sequel "Tanu Weds Manu Returns" is also highly appreciated. He is the composer behind popular songs like "Rangrez", "Yun Hi", "Piya Na Rahe Manbasiya", "O  Sathi Mere" and more.

Discography

Playback singing

He made his debut as a playback singer on his own composition "Rangrez" from Tanu Weds Manu.

 "Khamakha" Tamanchey (Hindi) (2014)
 "Rangrez" Tanu Weds Manu (Hindi) (2011)
 "Da di da da" Cute Kameena (Hindi) (2016)
 "Muhabbat Ko Misuse" Mirza Juuliet (Hindi) (2017)

As lyricist

Accolades

See also 
 Tanu Weds Manu
 Tanu Weds Manu Returns
 India's Daughter, A documentary film on gender inequality by Leslee Udwin
 Jolly LLB

References

External links
 
 
 
 Krsna Solo Official Blog 

Indian film score composers
Musicians from West Bengal
Bollywood playback singers
Indian male singer-songwriters
Indian singer-songwriters
Indian male film score composers
Year of birth missing (living people)
People from Siliguri
National Institute of Design alumni
Living people